Giovanni David (15 September 1790 in Naples – 1864 in Saint Petersburg) was an Italian tenor particularly known for his roles in Rossini operas.

Overview
David (also known as Davide) was the son of the tenor Giacomo David, with whom he studied.  He made his operatic début in Siena in 1808 in Adelaide de Guesclino by Johann Simon Mayr.  He is notable for the principal roles written for him by Gioachino Rossini, mostly for Domenico Barbaia's theatres in Naples:

Narciso in Il turco in Italia (1814)
Rodrigo in Otello (1816)
Ricciardo in Ricciardo e Zoraide (1818)
Oreste in Ermione (1819)
Uberto (James IV of Scotland) in La donna del lago (1819)
Ilo in Zelmira (1822)

He also created the roles of Fernando in the revised version of Bellini's Bianca e Fernando (1828) and Leicester in Donizetti's Il castello di Kenilworth (1829).

David was noted for his vocal range of almost 3 octaves in performance (up to b′&prime). However, according to Italian sources, David was certainly able to reach up only to F5 (and possibly to G5 or even to A5), but not higher. He was also famous for his ability to sing extremely florid music, although compared with his contemporary, Andrea Nozzari, his acting ability was limited.

He retired from the stage in 1839, and subsequently managed an opera company in Saint Petersburg, Russia.

References 
Notes

Sources

Caruselli, Salvatore (ed), Grande enciclopedia della musica lirica, Rome: Longanesi & C. Periodici S.p.A., Vol. II, ad nomen 
Forbes, Elizabeth (1997), "Davide [David], Giovanni", in Stanley Sadie, The New Grove Dictionary of Opera, New York: Oxford University Press 

1790 births
1864 deaths
Musicians from Naples
Italian operatic tenors
19th-century Italian male opera singers